Keitheatus is a genus of skeletonizing leaf beetles in the family Chrysomelidae. There is one described species in Keitheatus, Keitheatus blakeae. They are found in Texas.

A second species, Keitheatus histrio from Baja California in Mexico, was originally included in the genus, but was transferred to Pseudoluperus in 2005.

References

Further reading

 
 
 
 

Galerucinae
Articles created by Qbugbot
Monotypic Chrysomelidae genera